Process of elimination is a logical method to identify an entity of interest among several ones by excluding all other entities. In educational testing, it is a process of deleting options whereby the possibility of an option being correct is close to zero or significantly lower compared to other options. This version of the process does not guarantee success, even if only one option remains, since it eliminates possibilities merely as improbable. The process of elimination can only narrow the possibilities down, and thus, if the correct option is not amongst the known options, it will not arrive at the truth.

Method

The method of elimination is iterative. One looks at the answers, determines that several answers are unfit, eliminates these, and repeats, until one cannot eliminate any more. This iteration is most effectively applied when there is logical structure between the answers – that is to say, when by eliminating an answer one can eliminate several others. In this case one can find the answers which one cannot eliminate by eliminating any other answers and test them alone – the others are eliminated as a logical consequence; this is the idea behind optimizations for computerized searches when the input is sorted – as, for instance, in binary search.

In order for the method to work it is necessary to list all possible, even improbable, possibilities. Any omissions render the method invalid as a logical method.

Medicine
A process of elimination can be used to reach a diagnosis of exclusion. It is an underlying method in performing a differential diagnosis.

See also
 Law of excluded middle
 Philosophical razor
 Troubleshooting

References
 Richard L. Burden, J. Douglas Faires (2000). Numerical Analysis, 7th ed. Brooks/Cole. .

Philosophical logic
Philosophical methodology